Jamshedpur or Tatanagar is the largest and most populous city in Jharkhand and the first planned industrial city in India. It is a Notified Area Council and Municipal Corporation and also the headquarter of the East Singhbhum district. It is a popular tourist destination known for its forests, ancient temples and royal palaces. It was ranked as the cleanest city of India in the year 2019.

It was founded by Jamsetji Tata, founder of the Tata Group, and was named after him. It was established in 1919.

Jamshedpur was ranked as the cleanest city of India in 2020 by Swach Survekshan in 2020. Jamshedpur was ranked the 7th cleanest city of India in 2010. The city is also ranked as 2nd in India in terms of quality of life. Jamshedpur is the 84th fastest growing city in the world according to City Mayors Foundation. It is the headquarters of the East Singhbhum district of Jharkhand and is the 36th – largest urban agglomeration and 72nd largest city in India by population. It is one of the first Smart Cities in India along with Naya Raipur.

Etymology
In 1919 Lord Chelmsford renamed the city, which was originally Sakchi, to Jamshedpur in honour of its founder, Jamshedji Nusserwanji Tata. Tata had written to his son Dorabji Tata about his vision of a great city in the area. On Founders Day (3 March), the  Jubilee Park is decorated with brilliant lightwork for about a week.

History
The prospectors C. M. Weld, Dorabji Tata and Shapurji Saklatvala took nearly three years in a painstaking search across vast stretches of inhospitable terrain to find a location for a steel plant. One day they came across Sakchi (present-day a business district), on the densely forested stretches of the Chota Nagpur plateau, near the confluence of the Subarnarekha and Kharkai rivers. It seemed to be the ideal choice and the place was selected.

In 1908, the construction of the plant as well as the city officially began. The first steel ingot was rolled on 16 February 1912. It was a momentous day in the history of industrial India.

Jamsetji Tata's plan for the city was clear. He envisioned far more than a mere row of workers' hutments. He insisted upon building all the comforts and conveniences a city could provide. As a result, many areas in the city are well planned and there are public leisure places such as the Jubilee Park. While building the city, Tata had said:

Messrs Julin Kennedy Sahlin from Pittsburgh prepared the first layout of the town of Jamshedpur. Jamshedpur is a million-plus city with three municipal corporations, Jamshedpur Notified area committee, Jugsalai Municipal corporation and Mango Notified area committee.

In 1945, Tata Motors was setup here. It is now the second largest industry in Jamshedpur. A municipal corporation was proposed in 2005 but after protests from the residents this did not happen.

Geography

Jamshedpur is situated in the southern end of the state of Jharkhand and is bordered by the states of Odisha and West Bengal. The average elevation of the city is 135 metres while the range is from 129 m to 151 m. Total geographical area of Jamshedpur is 224 km square. Jamshedpur is primarily located in a hilly region and is surrounded by the Dalma Hills running from west to east and covered with dense forests. The other smaller hill ranges near the city are Ukam Hill and the Jadugoda-musabani hill range. The city is also a part of the larger Chota Nagpur Plateau region. The region is formed of the sedimentary, metamorphic and igneous rocks belonging to the Dharwarian period.

Jamshedpur is located at the confluence of the Kharkai and Subarnarekha Rivers. Subarnarekha is the principal river of Jamshedpur, which flows from west to south-eastern part of the territory. Many small rivers, especially the tributaries, join the Subarnarekha river in this area. The Kharkai flows from the south and joins the Subarnarekha river at a place called Domuhani. The two rivers are the major sources of drinking water and groundwater for the city. Several lakes of varying size are also located near the fringes of the city. The major of them being the Dimna lake located in between the Dalma range and the Sitarampur reservoir situated beside Kharkai river. It is also a major tourist spot in the region. Both of them also act as reservoirs for drinking water in the city. The city falls under deciduous type of forest region and the green cover is estimated to be around 33% of the total land area. The city falls under the Seismic Zone II region. Jamshedpur has many parks around it. Jubilee Park at Sakchi is the largest park in Jamshedpur. It was built by Jamshedji Tata, who was inspired by Vrindavanan Gardens of Mysore.

Climate

Cityscape and urban structure 
The center of Jamshedpur has commercial areas and main areas. Central Jamshedpur contains a financial and business district. Famous landmarks in the center include Jubilee Park and Tata Steel. Sakchi and Bistupur are the business and financial district. Center part is also the oldest part of the city. The Western portion of the city has the areas of Adityapur, Gamharia, and Sonari. Sonari is a residential and commercial neighborhood, while Adityapur and Gamharia are the major industrial neighborhoods. Adityapur is also a city and a part of Jamshedpur. Gamharia has an industrial area namely Industrial Area, Gamharia. Adityapur has the Adityapur Industrial Area. There are five national highways crossing the city. Mango Bridge connects the city center to Mango. Marine Drive is a popular road and picturesque promenade in Jamshedpur. It starts from Sonari and connects Adityapur.Adityapur has the NIT Jamshedpur. The southern part of Jamshedpur contains Jugsalai, Birsanagar, Kadma, Burmamines, TELCO Colony, Bagbera Colony and Jojobera. Jugsalai is the commercial area which is known for the wholesale market. while Birsanagar, Kadma and Bagbera consists of residential and commercial hubs. Burmamines, TELCO Colony, Bagbera Colony and Jojobera are the other main and major industrial areas of the city. Apart from north, whole areas of Jamshedpur has at least one industrial area. Other tall towers are TCE Building and Voltas House. In Jamshedpur, many hi-rise buildings are under construction now. Now the tallest building will be City Center II, which will be built at Adityapur. These tall buildings are mostly on the Central and Western side of the city. Jamshedpur has 10 - 14 floors of buildings.

Localities

Demographics

Population 
According to the 2011 census of India, the city of Jamshedpur had a population of 629,659, but the Jamshedpur Urban Agglomeration had a population of 1,337,131. The city is designated as a Million Plus Urban Agglomeration as per Government terminology. Males constitute 52.1% of the population and females 47.9%. Jamshedpur has an average literacy rate of 89.41% – higher than the national average of 74%. In Jamshedpur, 11.5% of the population is under six years of age.

Jamshedpur Urban Agglomeration includes: Jamshedpur (Industrial Town), Jamshedpur (NAC), Tata Nagar Railway Colony (OG), Mango (NAC), Jugsalai (M), Bagbera (CT), Chhota Gobindpur (CT), Haludbani (CT), Sarjamda (CT), Gadhra (CT), Ghorabandha (CT), Purihasa (CT), Adityapur (M Corp.), Chota Gamahria (CT) and Kapali (CT).

Language 
The official language is Hindi. The second most spoken language is Urdu. Additionally, in Jamshedpur, many East Indian languages are spoken, including Bengali, Magahi, Santhali and Odia. Punjabi is also spoken, as are some South Indian languages, such as Kannada and Tamil.

(For language details see Golmuri-cum-Jugsalai block#Language and religion.)

Religion and Ethnicity 
Hindus form the majority religion in Jamshedpur. While Muslims, Sikhs, and Christians form a significant minority. Jains and Buddhists also live in the city. Hindus are found in almost all areas of Jamshedpur. Muslims are also found in almost all areas of Jamshedpur, but many are concentrated in Maango, Sakchi, and Golmuri. Most Sikhs live in Golmuri and Sakchi. Christians are mostly found in the central part of the city. Tribals constitute around 28% of the population, and live in Birsanagar, a very large area covering a major part of Jamshedpur.

Migration 
Migration is a major reason behind Jamshedpur's increase in population and it being multicultural. When Jamshedpur was established, many people from Bihar, especially Muslims, migrated to the city for employment and later settled down there. In Jamshedpur many Muslims are from Bihari cities such as Bhagalpur, Darbhanga and Patna. Many Tamil and Kannadigas also settle in the city. Many other cities such as Dhanbad, Ranchi and Bokaro, which are in Jharkhand, are also filled with many migrants for jobs. While many other local people are also living in Jamshedpur, including Muslims, many Sikhs have also settled in the city. Many Punjabi Refugees are also present in the city at Punjabi Refugee Colony in Golmuri.

Economy

The largest industry in Jamshedpur is that of Tata Steel. It is situated in the centre of the city and occupies approximately 1/5 of the entire city area. It acts as a pivotal center for the industries of the city of Jamshedpur with a large number of them having direct or indirect linkages with it.
Tata Motors is the second major industry. It manufactures Medium and Heavy commercial vehicles and the main components. The company also has its own township commonly known as Telco.

Nuvoco Vistas Corp. Ltd is a cement plant located in Jojobera, Jamshedpur. It is Asia's largest Cement Grinding Unit.

There is a varied and powerful industrial base in the Adityapur Industrial Area. Jamshedpur is regarded as the industrial capital of Jharkhand.

Arts and Culture

Cinema 
Jamshedpur has influence on Hindi, and Bengali. Many films have been shot and based in the city and it is also sometimes called "Mini Mumbai" because of a great cinema culture and producing many film and television artists. Ritwik Ghatak's Subarnarekha, a 1962 Bengali film and Satyakam, a 1969 Hindi film starring Dharmendra and Sharmila Tagore were shot in Ghatsila area. Years after, film Udaan was shot and based in the city which also got screened in Cannes Film Festival. Bubble Gum film was based in the city and portions of M.S.Dhoni: The Untold Story were also shot in Jamshedpur. Buddhadeb Dasgupta's Bengali film, Urojohaj was also shot in outskirts of city. The movie Dil Bechara, starring Sushant Singh Rajput and John Abraham's directorial Banana were also shot in the city. Many entertainers are also from this city such as Priyanka Chopra, R. Madhavan and Imtiaz Ali.

Government 

The civic administration of the city is under Greater Jamshedpur Metropolitan Region, Govt of Jharkhand.

The major urban local bodies are:
 Jamshedpur Industrial Town
 Jamshedpur Notified Area Committee (JNAC)
 Mango Municipal Corporation
 Adityapur Municipal Corporation
 Jugsalai Nagar Parishad
 Kapali Nagar Parishad

Education

Important educational institutions in Jamshedpur are:
XLRI, founded in 1949, is the oldest management institute of India; Mahatma Gandhi Memorial Medical College, established in 1961; and the engineering college National Institute of Technology, Jamshedpur, an Institute of National Importance, established as a Regional Institute of Technology on 15 August 1960. The National Metallurgical Laboratory (NML), one of the 38 Council of Scientific and Industrial Research (CSIR) laboratories, was inaugurated on 26 November 1950 by Jawaharlal Nehru. Shavak Nanavati Technical Institute (SNTI), established in 1921 as the technical training department of Tata Steel, now develops skilled employees for other companies as well. Its 400,000 volume library is one of the most popular in the city. Many high level institutions are located in Jamshedpur. Now there is further development to setup more universities and several other educational institutions.

Sports

Jamshedpur's private clubs provide opportunities for activities, such as golf, tennis, squash, billiards, horseriding and water scootering. Jamshedpur FC is an ISL team based in Jamshedpur. The team is owned by Tata Steel.

Facilities and academies 
Sporting facilities and academies include:
 JRD Tata Sports Complex has an international standard multi-use stadium and an eight-lane mono-synthetic track. It is primarily used for football and athletics but facilities for various other sports including archery, basketball, field hockey, swimming, table tennis, tennis, volleyball, skating, yoga as well as a modern gymnasium, are available at the complex. The stadium hosted the women football competition & archery event of the 34th National Games in 2011.
 Keenan Stadium hosted its 1st International One Day Cricket match on 7 December 1983 in which India lost to the touring West Indies Team. Many other International matches have been played here in which India has won only one match against South Africa in 1999–2000.
 Tata Football Academy was started in 1987 to nurture budding Indian footballers and raise the standard of Indian football. TFA is a football club in Jamshedpur, sponsored by Tata Steel. Today, Tata Football Academy is one of the premier football breeding grounds in India.
 Tata Archery Academy: archery is a sport indigenous to the tribal people of Chhotanagpur and Santhal Pargana. Tata Steel has pursued and nurtured the local tribals and provided them with facilities and training to bring them up to international competition standards in archery. Its students have attributed a lot of fame to the institute by bringing in many medals in National and International competitions.
 Tata Steel Adventure Foundation – Bachendri Pal, the first Indian woman to climb Mount Everest, is the director of Tata Steel Adventure Foundation.

Jamshedpur has two golf courses—the Beldih Golf Course and the Golmuri Golf Course. Both of these courses are at the heart of the city. The biggest is the Beldih Golf Course which is around 6,000 yards. The Golmuri Golf Course although smaller is also challenging. They together hold the annual Tata Open Golf Tournament which is an event held under the support of the Professional Golf Tour of India. The tournament was started in 2002. Jamshedpur also has the Jamshedpur Gliding Club and the Jamshedpur Co-operative Flying club.

Media

Television 
Jamshedpur has various local news broadcast and cable media channels including:
 Aaj Tak
 ABP News

Print
English, Santali, and Bengali newspapers are published from the city, including.

Hindi newspapers
 Dainik Jagran
 Dainik Bhaskar
 Hindustan Dainik
 Prabhat Khabar

English newspapers
 The Avenue Mail.

Bengali Newspapers
 Khobor Kagoj

Transportation
 The Tatanagar Junction on the Chakradharpur railway division of the South Eastern Railway, is the major railhead of Jamshedpur. Other railway stations in the city include Adityapur, Gamharia, Kandra and Govindpur.

Jamshedpur is connected to other parts of India through national and state highways. The major highways are:
 National Highway 33 (NH-33) touches the city and connects it to Mumbai and further joins the NH32, which connects with Kolkata, Delhi NH-2, NH-33 and NH-6 connects it to Kharagpur, Kolkata.
 National Highway 18 (NH-18) connects Jamshedpur to Dhanbad, Via Bokaro.
 Tata-Kandra Road connects Jamshedpur to Kandra via Gamahria.
 Marine Drive, Jamshedpur connects Adityapur Toll Bridge to Mango via Kadma, Sonari through the western corridors of Jamshedpur

Jamshedpur has a bus station in Maango. This bus station have buses which go to other cities like Bokaro, Dhanbad, Ranchi etc. However, now there is a plan to update and rebuild and renovate this bus stand/station.

Sonari Airport is serving the city at present. It is spread over a 25-acre area in the Sonari area of the city. The airport is primarily used for bringing in chartered planes of TATA group. In previous days there were flights from Jamshedpur to Kolkata.

Dhalbhumgarh Airport is a proposed public airport located at Dhalbhumgarh, in the state of Jharkhand, India as a greenfield airport for Jamshedpur. The old airfield was built around 1942, as an ancillary runway for other airfields in the vicinity that were being built around India's eastern frontier as part of the war effort.

It was one of the airfields used by Allied forces to repel the advancing Japanese troops and to maintain transport links with China. As the Japanese forces came to control shipping in the China Sea, seaborne supply routes to China were cut and the difficult  route over the Himalayas was increasingly used. The airfield was abandoned after the war. The technical team of the Airports Authority of India (AAI) conducted a survey in 2017 and approved the Dhalbhumgarh site for a greenfield airport. The government plans to invest Rs 300 crore through AAI for the new airport which will have a  runway. In January 2018, Union Minister of State for Civil Aviation Jayant Sinha announced that the Union Civil Aviation Ministry and the Jharkhand Government would sign a Memorandum of Understanding (MoU) for the construction of Dhalbhumgarh Airport.

In 2022, it is announced that the Sonari Airport will start commercial public flights for Jamshedpur to Bhubaneswar and Kolkata. After efforts from the Ministry of Civil Aviation, Government of Jharkhand and Tata Steel, the airport has been reopened on 31 January 2023, with flight services provided by the new low-cost regional airline, IndiaOne Air, to Kolkata and Bhubaneswar.

Tourism 
Jamshedpur has a number of popular tourist destinations, including: 
Jubilee Park, built by Jamsetji Tata and was inspired by Vrindavan Gardens of Mysore
 Dalma Wild Life Sanctuary
 Dimna Lake, artificial reservoir
 Tata Steel Zoological Park
 JRD Tata Sports Complex, home stadium of Jamshedpur FC and held 2011 National Games
Marine Drive, Jamshedpur, one of the few marine drives in India
Dalma Hills, hill range surrounding East Singhbhum
Ghatshila, a picnic spot
Jamshedpur Coin Museum, museum has got 1200 rare and antique coins of varied mint & metals and also has the world's smallest coin dating back to 300–400 AD
Sumant Moolgaonkar Park, build near HUDCO Lake
Millenium Park
The Russi Modi Centre of Excellence

Notable people

 

 Varun Aaron, cricketer
 Imtiaz Ali, director
 Pratyusha Banerjee, television actress
 Priyanka Chopra, Indian singer, actress and winner of Miss World 2000 
 Rasika Dugal, actress
 Gerald Durrell, OBE, conservationist
 Ishita Dutta, actress
 Tanushree Dutta, former Femina Miss India and actress
 Adarsh Gourav, actor
 Ishank Jaggi, cricketer
 Saba Karim, cricketer
 Kamlesh Kumar, teacher and social activist
 R. Madhavan, actor
 Manmohan, actor
 Shomu Mukherjee, filmmaker 
 Gourav Mukhi, footballer
 Shweta Prasad, actress
 Arshadul Qadri, scholar
 K. V. P. Rao, cricketer
 Shilpa Rao, singer
 Randhir Singh, cricketer
 Simone Singh, Indian television actress
 Akshat Singh, YouTuber
 Saurabh Tiwary, cricketer

References

External links

 East Singhbhum District Administration website
 TataSteel.com: Fact File on Jamshedpur (Tata City)
 Galli Magazine: Photo essay on Jamshedpur (Tatanagar / Tata City)
 Wikimapia.org: Satellite images of Jamshedpur

 
1919 establishments in British India

All articles containing potentially dated statements
Articles containing potentially dated statements from 2011
Cities and towns in East Singhbhum district

Company towns in India
East Singhbhum district
Metropolitan cities in India
Planned cities in India
Populated places established in 1919
Tata Group
Wikipedia pages needing cleanup from August 2012